Reg Grundy Organisation (founded as Reg Grundy Enterprises, later known as both Reg Grundy Productions and Grundy Television and known informally as Grundy's) was an Australian-based multinational mass media company, primarily involved in television as a production company but also in distribution and licensing.  

Reg Grundy, the company's namesake founded the media enterprise locally in 1959, It branched out internationally in the late 1980s under the banner Grundy World Wide Limited with divisions in Europe, United Kingdom, the United States and Asia 

The company first produced game shows, then branched into soap operas in 1973. In 1995 Reg Grundy sold the company to Pearson Television, now known as Fremantle, part of the RTL Group (in turn 90% owned by Bertelsmann). In 2006 Fremantle merged Grundy Television and Crackerjack Productions to form the localised arm Fremantle Australia. Until 2013 the Grundy name still existed internationally in Germany as Grundy Light Entertainment and in Italy as Grundy Productions Italy.

Company history/foundation
Reg Grundy's started his media career in radio, before moving to television producing Wheel of Fortune which launched on Nine Network in 1959. Another show with this title, although based on the USA version celebrated its 25th anniversary in Australia, a week before its cancellation in July 2006.

In the late 1980s Reg Grundy established 'Grundy World Wide Limited. He created and operated local, independent television production and distribution companies in Europe, Asia and North and South America.

Pearson Television (now Fremantle) acquired the Grundy group of companies in April 1995. On 30 August 2006, FremantleMedia announced they would merge Grundy Television with their other Australian production company, Crackerjack Productions, to form a single "super" production company called "FremantleMedia Australia". The new company is now managed by the management team from Crackerjack, with Mark Fennessy as chief executive officer and his brother Carl Fennessy as chief operating officer.

Simon Spalding (Fremantle Director of Asia Pacific Operations) said in an interview that Grundy Television's premises in Sydney are to be refurbished and that once complete, all Sydney based staff will be located there. He claims that this will help to create a 'deeper' production facility and is not a cost-cutting exercise. Spalding also said that although the Grundy name would be disappearing, he was looking at how FremantleMedia could retain the Grundy name and the heritage associated with it.

Programmes 
See Fremantle Australia

Divisions 
The company had several divisions in other countries:

France
Grundy France EURL - the now defunct French division (later Pearson Television France in 1999) which was best known for producing Questions pour un champion, along with other programs Le Juste Prix and La Gym de Neurones, now known as Fremantle France SAS.

Germany
Grundy Light Entertainment - the German division, which produces such shows as Ruck Zuck (best known of Grundy's German game shows), Das Quiz mit Jörg Pilawa, Q-Boot, along owing and producing German versions of RTL Group formats Family Feud (Familien-Duell), Sale of the Century (Hopp oder Top), and The Price Is Right (Der Preis ist heiß). Since September 2013, the company has been renamed "UFA Show & Factual".

Italy
Grundy Productions Italy - Italian division, which was founded in 1980 and produced programs like Furore and Un posto al sole, now known as Fremantle Italia SpA.

Mexico
Grundy Productions Mexico S.A. de C.V. - Now known as Fremantle Mexico S.A. de C.V..

Spain
Grundy Producciones Spain - Now known as Fremantle España S.A..

Sweden
Their Swedish operation produced a local version of Sons and Daughters - Skilda världar. It also produced the Swedish version of Card Sharks - Lagt kort ligger.

United States
Reg Grundy Productions was the American wing of the worldwide television production company Grundy Worldwide, founded by Australian television producer Reg Grundy. Reg Grundy Productions was responsible for the production of two highly successful daytime game shows on NBC during the 1980s, Sale of the Century and Scrabble, and produced a revival of Scrabble in 1993. The company also produced Time Machine (a history-themed game show similar in format to The Price Is Right) and Scattergories for NBC, Bruce Forsyth's Hot Streak for ABC and Small Talk for The Family Channel. Of the game shows Grundy produced in America, only Sale and the original Scrabble were hits; Time Machine lasted 16 weeks, Bruce Forsyth's Hot Streak, and Small Talk had 13-week runs each and Scattergories and the revival of Scrabble were cancelled after five months (the latter returning only on a limited basis). Frequent announcers of the company's game shows included Jay Stewart, Don Morrow, Gene Wood and Charlie Tuna. 

Bill Mason (who was EP of Sale of the Century, Jeopardy! and Wheel of Fortune New Zealand) operated the American-based Grundy operation, and was the executive in charge of production for all of the Grundy-based game shows in the States. Former co-creator of game show Concentration, Robert Noah was also the driving force behind several of the aforementioned game shows, including Time, Sale and Scrabble.

The company also produced re-edited versions of the highly successful soap operas Prisoner and on some markets Neighbours

In the United States, RGP was headquartered in west Los Angeles, near Century City, and was responsible for launching the career of television and talent agent entrepreneur, Sean Perry, whose father Jim Perry, hosted Sale of the Century, the company, along with Mark Goodson Productions, is now defunct and folded into Fremantle North America.

United Kingdom
Reg Grundy Productions opened up a UK branch in 1975 known as "Reg Grundy Productions (G.B.) Limited".

The UK branch produced two big BBC programmes - Going for Gold and Small Talk. They also produced three cult shows for ITV called Keynotes, Celebrity Squares and Man O Man.

In 1997, Grundy UK began producing a majority of Channel 5's launch programmes, producing shows such as 100%, Whittle, Night Fever, Fort Boyard, Win Beadle's Money, One to Win (a revival of Going for Gold), Greed and The Desert Forges.

In 1999, the existing programmes produced by Pearson Television subsidiary Fremantle (UK) Productions were moved to Grundy UK, which included the two Bruce Forsyth game shows such as Play Your Cards Right and The Price Is Right as well as a Tim Clark game show called Give Us a Clue, a Michael Barrymore game show called Strike It Lucky, a Paul O'Grady game show called Lily Savage's Blankety Blank, a Dale Winton game show called Dale's Supermarket Sweep and Liza Tarbuck's version of Blockbusters.

By 2006, all remaining shows produced under the Grundy name were transitioned off to Talkback Thames.

References

External links 
 

Television production companies of Australia
Television production companies of the United States
Mass media companies established in 1959
Mass media companies disestablished in 2006
RTL Group
Former Bertelsmann subsidiaries
Australian companies established in 1959
1995 mergers and acquisitions
Australian companies disestablished in 2006
2006 mergers and acquisitions